Rypien is a surname derived from Polish Rypień. Notable people with the surname include:

Angela Rypien (born 1990), American football player
Brett Rypien (born 1996), American football player
Mark Rypien (born 1962), American football player
Rick Rypien (1984-2011), Canadian hockey player

See also
 

Polish-language surnames